The Laotian records in swimming are the fastest ever performances of swimmers from Laos, which are recognised and ratified by the Lao Swimming Federation.

All records were set in finals unless noted otherwise.

Long Course (50 m)

Men

Women

Short Course (25 m)

Men

Women

References

Laos
Records
Swimming